Frances Hales (died 3 February 1769), later Countess of Lichfield, was an English aristocrat and philanthropist.

She was the daughter of Sir John Hales, 4th Bt, and grew up at Hales Place near Canterbury, Kent. 

She married George Lee, 2nd Earl of Lichfield, at a private ceremony before May 1718.

They had nine children together:

 Lady Charlotte Lee (d. 11 Jun 1794), who married Henry Dillon, 11th Viscount Dillon
 Edward Henry Lee (d. 1742)
 Charles Henry Lee (d. 1740)
 Lady Mary Lee
 George Henry Lee, 3rd Earl of Lichfield (21 May 1718 – 19 Sep 1772)
 Lady Frances Lee (21 Jan 1721 – 29 Jan 1761), who is thought to have married Henry Hyde, Viscount Cornbury
 Frances Lee (Nov 1721 - 1723), who died in infancy
 Lady Henrietta Lee (1726 - 30 Apr 1752), who married John Bellew, 4th Baron Bellew of Duleek
 Lady Anne Lee (c. 1731 - 9 Dec 1802), who married Hugh Clifford, 4th Baron Clifford of Chudleigh, and had children

She was one of the signatories to Thomas Coram's petition to King George II to establish the Foundling Hospital, which she signed on 27 April 1730.

She died on 3 February 1769.

References 

Daughters of baronets
Lichfield
English philanthropists
Year of birth missing
1769 deaths